Philip Trajetta (Filippo Traetta) (January 8, 1777 – January 9, 1854) was an Italian-born American composer and music teacher. The son of Italian composer Tommaso Traetta, in 1800 he moved as a political refugee to the United States, where he had a successful musical career as a composer and one of the founders of music conservatories in Boston (1801), New York (1812), and Philadelphia (1828).

Biography

Filippo Traetta was born in Venice, Italy, on January 8, 1777. He was the son of opera composer Tommaso Traetta and Elizabeth Sund from Russian Finland. The couple met at St. Petersburg when Tommaso was serving at the invitation of Catherine II of Russia as singing instructor and musical director of the opera there. Upon the death of his father, Filippo was about three years of age, placing Elizabeth in charge of his education in Venice. He attended a Jesuit school until the age of 13 and then studied with music teachers Fedele Fenaroli and Salvatore Perillo, from whom he learned counterpoint, the art of the fugue and composition. He was next sent to Naples to study with composer Niccolò Piccinni.

In 1799, Traetta was involved in a failed revolution against King Ferdinand IV of Naples. He was arrested for authoring several patriotic, anti-monarchy hymns. He served eight months in prison before he was given a German passport and smuggled into the United States, arriving aboard Mount Vernon, a vessel that belonged to the Derby family of Salem, Massachusetts, on July 3, 1800.

Now known as Philip Trajetta, he settled in Boston, Massachusetts. There he and two partners, François Delochaire Mallet of France and Gottlieb Graupner of Germany, announced in an advertisement in the Boston Gazette on November 24, 1800, the founding of a music academy called the American Conservatorio of Boston. It was the first such institution in the United States and lasted just two years. Two of his orchestral works were performed in Boston in that year, a sinfonia and a violin concerto. There he also wrote some of his early works, including "Washington's Dead March", a patriotic work marking the death of George Washington in December 1799, which remained popular for decades. In the same year he moved to New York, where he completed The Venetian Maskers, which can be described as the first opera composed in the United States, though it was never staged. In the following two decades he divided his time between New York and Charleston.

He relocated to New York City about 1809 and by 1812 founded the American Conservatorio of New York. Advertisements for the Conservatorio's concerts at its home on Fulton Street appeared in local newspapers until 1817. He composed a cantata, Jubilate, Peace, to celebrate the Treaty of Ghent, signed on December 24, 1814, that concluded the War of 1812. He conducted its premiere in New York on February 21, 1815.

In the first half of the 1820s, Trajetta settled in Philadelphia, which became his permanent home. By 1828, he founded the American Conservatory in Philadelphia. There he composed two oratorios, Jerusalem in Affliction and Daughter of Zion, which had their premieres in Philadelphia in 1828 and 1829 respectively. A comprehensive history of the oratorio form describes them as "[p]resumably the earliest oratorios composed in America". Trajetta continued to give music lessons at the conservatory and to direct musical performances until his death.

Trajetta died in Philadelphia on January 9, 1854, and was buried in the Odd Fellows Burial Ground.

Works

Cantatas
 The Christian's Joy: Prophecy
 The Nativity
 The Day of Rest
 Jubilate, Peace

Operas
 The Venetian Maskers

Oratorios
 Jerusalem in Affliction (Philadelphia, 1828; then Germantown, 1854)
 Daughter of Zion (Philadelphia, 1829; then Germantown, 1854)

Other musical works
Washington's Dead March
"The Sailor, An Elegy", for piano and voice (February 1801)
"Lovely Maid the Fields Invite You", piano and voice(s)

Essays
An Introduction to the Art and Science of Music (Philadelphia, 1829)
Rudiments of the Art of Singing, Written and Composed for the American Conservatorio (Philadelphia, 1841-3)
A Primer of Music (Philadelphia, 1843)
Traetta's Preludes for the Piano Forte...Introductory to his System of Thorough Bass (Philadelphia, 1857)

Notes

References

Sources
 Sciannameo, Franco, and Michael J. Budds (2010). Phil Trajetta (1777-1854), Patriot, Musician, Immigrant: Commentary on His Life and Work in Context. Hillsdale, N.Y: Pendragon Press.
 Cantrell, Byron (2001). "Trajetta, Filippo." The New Grove Dictionary of Music and Musicians. Vol. 25, 2nd ed. Ed. Stanley Sadie. New York: Grove.
 Slonimsky, Nicolas, Laura Kuhn, and Dennis McIntire (2001). "Traetta, Filippo". Baker’s Biographical Dictionary of Musicians. 6 vols. Eds. Nicolas Slonimsky and Laura Kuhn. New York: Schirmer Books.
Richard J. Wolfe, ed. (1964) "Traetta, Philip". Secular Music in America, 1801-1825: A Bibliography. 3 vols. New York: New York Public Library.

External links
"Traetta, Filippo", The Pennsylvania Center for the Book

1777 births
1854 deaths
18th-century American musicians
18th-century classical composers
18th-century Italian male musicians
19th-century American composers
19th-century classical composers
19th-century Italian male musicians
American Romantic composers
American male classical composers
American opera composers
Male opera composers
United States military musicians
Oratorio composers
Musicians from Venice
Classical musicians from Pennsylvania
Musicians from Philadelphia
Italian emigrants to the United States